Corbett Historic District is a national historic district at Monkton, Baltimore County, Maryland, United States. It is a group of 20 dwellings, a doctor's office, a former store/post office, a brothel, and a school comprising the village of Corbett in rural northern Baltimore County, Maryland. Most of the buildings date from about 1880 through about 1920.  They reflect the period of Corbett's development as a stop on the Northern Central Railway, and a local commercial, industrial, and transportation center for the surrounding farms.

It was added to the National Register of Historic Places in 1985.

References

External links
, including photo from 1985, at Maryland Historical Trust
Boundary Map of the Corbett Historic District, Baltimore County, at Maryland Historical Trust

Historic districts in Baltimore County, Maryland
Greek Revival architecture in Maryland
Colonial Revival architecture in Maryland
Historic districts on the National Register of Historic Places in Maryland
National Register of Historic Places in Baltimore County, Maryland